Sisurcana somatina is a species of moth of the family Tortricidae. It is found in Colombia and Ecuador (Cotopaxi Province).

References

Moths described in 1912
Sisurcana